Aderonke Kale is a Nigerian army psychiatrist who became the first female major-general in the Nigerian Army. She rose to command the Nigerian Army Medical Corps.

Career 
Aderonke Kale trained as a medical doctor at University College, which later became the University of Ibadan. Kale then specialised in Psychiatry at the University of London. She was inspired to join psychiatry by Professor Thomas Adeoye Lambo, Africa's first professor of psychiatry. She worked briefly in Britain and returned to Nigeria in 1971.

A year later in 1972, she joined the Nigerian Army. This was a very rare decision for women in those days, particularly those at such a high professional level. She was a colonel and deputy commander of the Nigerian Army Medical Corps by 1990. She was later promoted to the rank of brigadier-general and in doing so became the first female general in West Africa. Kale was promoted to major-general in 1994 and became the first Nigerian woman to achieve that rank. She was also the first female major-general in West Africa. Her role was initially as chief psychiatrist to the army. Kale later became director of the entire Nigerian Medical Corps and was its Chief Medical Officer until 1996. This was the first time in the history of the Nigerian Army that a woman was given responsibility for the healthcare of all Nigerian soldiers at all levels in preparation for and during war. She retired in 1997.

Personal life
Aderonke Kale was born on 13th, February 1959.Kale's father was a pharmacist and her mother a teacher and they ensured she had a good education. Kale went to primary school in Lagos and Zaria and undertook secondary education in St. Anne's School, Ibadan and Abeokuta Grammar School.

Kale had a son in 1975, Yemi Kale, who became statistician-general of Nigeria. She provided land for the founding of the Bodija-Ashi Baptist Church in Ibadan.

Kale is a Yoruba.

See also 
 Abimbola Amusu

References 

Living people
Nigerian generals
Female army generals
Nigerian women medical doctors
Nigerian psychiatrists
Nigerian military doctors
Yoruba women physicians
Yoruba female military personnel
History of women in Nigeria
20th-century births
Nigerian female military personnel
Year of birth missing (living people)
Alumni of the University of London
St Anne's School, Ibadan alumni